Maureen St John Pook (23 May 1922 – 5 May 1977), known professionally as Maureen Pryor, was an Irish-born English character actress who made stage, film, and television appearances. The Encyclopaedia of British Film noted, "she never played leads, but, with long rep and TV experience (from 1949), she was noticeable in all she did."

Early life
Pryor was born in Limerick, Ireland, to a British father and an Irish mother. She began acting with Manchester Repertory in 1938, and studied with Michel Saint-Denis at the London Theatre Studio in 1939.

Career
She appeared in the West End in Seán O'Casey's Red Roses for Me, Noël Coward's Peace in Our Time, John Griffith Bowen's After the Rain (also on Broadway), Doris Lessing's Play with a Tiger and plays such as Little Boxes and Where's Tedd. She was a member of the Stables Theatre Company. She also appeared on Broadway in the premiere season of Boeing-Boeing (1965). In Manchester, she appeared in Eugene O'Neill's one-act play Before Breakfast, directed by Bill Gilmour. She also directed the play herself, for the RSC at the Old Red Lion, Stratford, in 1975. She played Mistress Quickly in Terry Hand's 1975/76 production of Henry IV, Part 2 and Henry V also for the Royal Shakespeare Company.

She made over 500 television appearances, including a Play for Today, "O Fat White Woman" (1971), adapted by William Trevor from his own short story, and Ken Russell's television film Song of Summer (1968), in which she played Jelka Delius, the long-suffering wife of the composer Frederick Delius. Russell cast her again in his cinema film The Music Lovers (1970) as Tchaikovsky's mother-in-law. In the 1974 BBC television film Shoulder to Shoulder, she played the composer Dame Ethel Smyth.

In the 1970's British police drama The Sweeney, episode Big Spender, she appeared as Edith Wardle the wife of a dishonest employee of a car park company who becomes involved in an elaborate fraud.

Personal life
Her first marriage ended in divorce, her second in separation. She had one son, Mark. She died in 1977 from a heart ailment.

Selected filmography
 Room for Two (1940)
 The Lady with a Lamp (1951) – Sister Wheeler
 The Weak and the Wicked (1954) – Prison Matron
 Doctor in the House (1954) – Mrs. Cooper
 Orders Are Orders (1954) – Miss Marigold 
 Angel Pavement (1957-1958, TV series) – Mrs. Smeeth
 The Secret Place (1957) – Mrs. Haywood
 Doctor at Large (1957) – Mrs. Dalton
 Heart of a Child (1958) – Frau Spiel
 Conspiracy of Hearts (1960) – Sister Consuela
 The Secret Kingdom (1960, TV series) – Paula Byron
 No Love for Johnnie (1961) – Labour Party Member
 Life for Ruth (1962) – Teddy's mother
 Madhouse on Castle Street (TV, 1963; Mrs Griggs; this was Bob Dylan's acting debut)
 Modesty Blaise (1966) – (scenes deleted)
 The Sandwich Man (1966)
 Three Bites of the Apple (1967) – Birdie Guffy
 Omnibus: Song of Summer (TV, 1968)
 The Music Lovers (1970) – Nina's Mother
 Lady Caroline Lamb (1972) – Mrs. Buller
 The National Health (1973) – The Matron
 Shoulder to Shoulder (1974, BBC TV; as ) – Dame Ethel Smyth
 The Black Windmill (1974) – Jane Harper
 The Sweeney (1975) – Enid Wardle

References

External links 
 
 

1922 births
1977 deaths
Alumni of the London Theatre Studio
English film actresses
English television actresses
English stage actresses
Irish film actresses
Irish stage actresses
Irish television actresses
Actresses from Limerick (city)
20th-century Irish actresses
20th-century English actresses
Irish people of English descent
Irish emigrants to the United Kingdom